This is a list of Mexican films released in 2008.

2008

References

External links

List of 2008 box office number-one films in Mexico

2008
Films
Mexican